Stagmatophora tetradesma is a species of moth in the  family Cosmopterigidae. It is found in Australia, where it has been recorded from Western Australia.

References

Natural History Museum Lepidoptera generic names catalog

Cosmopteriginae
Moths of Australia
Moths described in 1897